was the 41st monarch of Japan, according to the traditional order of succession.

Jitō's reign spanned the years from 686 through 697.

In the history of Japan, Jitō was the third of eight women to take on the role of empress regnant.  The two female monarchs before Jitō were Suiko and Kōgyoku/Saimei. The five women sovereigns reigning after Jitō were Genmei, Genshō, Kōken/Shōtoku, Meishō, and Go-Sakuramachi.

Traditional narrative

Empress Jitō was the daughter of Emperor Tenji. Her mother was Ochi-no-Iratsume, the daughter of Minister Ō-omi Soga no Yamada-no Ishikawa Maro. She was the wife of Tenji's full brother Emperor Tenmu, whom she succeeded on the throne.

Events of Jitō's reign
Jitō took responsibility for court administration after the death of her husband, Emperor Tenmu, who was also her uncle.  She acceded to the throne in 687 in order to ensure the eventual succession of her son, Kusakabe-shinnō.  Throughout this period, Empress Jitō ruled from the Fujiwara Palace in Yamato. In 689, Jitō prohibited Sugoroku, in 690 at enthronement she performed special ritual then gave pardon and in 692 she travelled to Ise against the counsel of minister Miwa-no-Asono-Takechimaro.

Prince Kusakabe was named as crown prince to succeed Jitō, but he died at a young age.  Kusakabe's son, Karu-no-o, was then named as Jitō's successor.  He eventually would become known as Emperor Monmu.

Empress Jitō reigned for eleven years. Although there were seven other reigning empresses, their successors were most often selected from amongst the males of the paternal Imperial bloodline, which is why some conservative scholars argue that the women's reigns were temporary and that male-only succession tradition must be maintained in the 21st century.  Empress Genmei, who was followed on the  throne by her daughter, Empress Genshō, remains the sole exception to this conventional argument.

In 697, Jitō abdicated in Monmu's favor; and as a retired sovereign, she took the post-reign title daijō-tennō.  After this, her imperial successors who retired took the same title after abdication.

Jitō continued to hold power as a cloistered ruler, which became a persistent trend in Japanese politics.

The actual site of Jitō's grave is known.  This empress is traditionally venerated at a memorial Shinto shrine (misasagi) at Nara.

The Imperial Household Agency designates this location as Jitō's mausoleum.  It is formally named Ochi-no-Okanoe no misasagi.

Kugyō
Kugyō (公卿) is a collective term for the very few most powerful men attached to the court of the Emperor of Japan in pre-Meiji eras.

In general, this elite group included only three to four men at a time.  These were hereditary courtiers whose experience and background would have brought them to the pinnacle of a life's career.  During Jitō's reign, this apex of the  Daijō-kan included:
 Daijō-daijin, Takechi-shinnō (the 3rd son of Emperor Tenmu)
 Sadaijin
 Udaijin
 Naidaijin

Non-nengō period
Jitō's reign is not linked by scholars to any era or nengō.  The Taika era innovation of naming time periods – nengō – languished until Mommu reasserted an imperial right by proclaiming the commencement of Taihō in 701.
 See Japanese era name – "Non-nengo periods"
 See Jitō period (687–697).

However, Brown and Ishida's translation of Gukanshō offers an explanation which muddies a sense of easy clarity:
"The eras that fell in this reign were: (1) the remaining seven years of Shuchō [(686+7=692?)]; and (2) Taika, which was four years long [695–698]. (The first year of this era was kinoto-hitsuji [695].)  ... In the third year of the Taka era [697], Empress Jitō yielded the throne to the Crown Prince."

Family 
Empress Jitō,  known as Princess Uno-no-sarara (鸕野讃良皇女) in her early days, was born to Emperor Tenji and his concubine,  who held of Beauty (Hin).She had two full siblings: Princess Ōta and Prince Takeru. Empress Jitō and her younger sister, Princess Ōta, shared the same husband, Emperor Tenmu,  with whom both would have children.

Husband: Emperor Tenmu (天武天皇, Tenmu tennō, c. 631 – October 1, 686), son of Emperor Jomei and Empress Kōgyoku
Son: Crown Prince Kusakabe (草壁皇子,  662 – May 10, 689)

Poetry
The Man'yōshū includes poems said to have been composed by Jitō. This one was composed after the death of the Emperor Tenmu:

One of the poems attributed to Empress Jitō was selected by Fujiwara no Teika for inclusion in the very popular anthology Hyakunin Isshu:

Ancestry

See also
 Empress of Japan
 Emperor of Japan
 List of emperors of Japan
 Imperial cult

Notes

References
 Aston, William George. (1896).  Nihongi: Chronicles of Japan from the Earliest Times to A.D. 697. London: Kegan Paul, Trench, Trubner. 
 Brown, Delmer M. and Ichirō Ishida, eds. (1979).  Gukanshō: The Future and the Past. Berkeley: University of California Press. ; 
 MacCauley, Clay. (1900). "Hyakunin-Isshu: Single Songs of a Hundred Poets" in Transactions of the Asia Society of Japan. Tokyo: Asia Society of Japan. ...Click link for digitized, full-text copy (in English)
 __. (1901). Kokka taikan. Tokyo: Teikoku Toshokan, Meiji 30–34 [1897–1901]. [reprinted Shinten kokka taikan (新編国歌大観), 10 vols. + 10 index vols., Kadokawa Shoten, Tokyo, 1983–1992. 
 Nippon Gakujutsu Shinkōkai. (1940). Man'yōshū. Tokyo: Iwanami shoten. [reprinted by Columbia University Press, New York, 1965. . Rprinted by Dover Publications, New York, 2005. 
 Ponsonby-Fane, Richard Arthur Brabazon. (1959).  The Imperial House of Japan. Kyoto: Ponsonby Memorial Society. 
 Titsingh, Isaac. (1834). Nihon Ōdai Ichiran; ou,  Annales des empereurs du Japon.  Paris: Royal Asiatic Society, Oriental Translation Fund of Great Britain and Ireland. 
 Varley, H. Paul. (1980).  Jinnō Shōtōki: A Chronicle of Gods and Sovereigns. New York: Columbia University Press. ;

External links
 Asuka Historical National Government Park:  image of Mausoleum Emperor Tenmu and Empress Jitō , exterior view

 
 

 Women rulers in Japan
645 births
703 deaths
7th-century Japanese women writers
7th-century writers
7th-century monarchs in Asia
7th-century women rulers
8th-century Japanese women
7th-century Japanese monarchs
8th-century Japanese people
Japanese empresses regnant
Japanese women poets
Women of medieval Japan
People of Asuka-period Japan
Man'yō poets
Hyakunin Isshu poets
7th-century Japanese women
7th-century Japanese people
Emperor Tenmu
Japanese princesses
Japanese retired emperors
Daughters of emperors